Gordon Dickinson (1901–1991) was an Australian tennis player. While at school he showed promise at cricket and was a versatile left handed tennis player. Dickinson won the Burnie men's singles event in 1923 and 1924. Dickinson first entered the Australasian championships in 1924, when he lost in the quarter finals to Garton Hone. In 1927, Dickinson lost in round two of the Australian championships to Gordon Lum. In 1927 Dickinson sustained an eye injury from a piece of wood, an injury that required surgical treatment.

References

1901 births
1991 deaths
Australian male tennis players
Tennis people from Victoria (Australia)
20th-century Australian people